Richard Edjericon is a Canadian politician in the Northwest Territories. He was elected to the Legislative Assembly of the Northwest Territories in a 2022 by-election, representing the electoral district of Tu Nedhé-Wiilideh. Edjericon previously ran for the seat in the 2019 election, placing second behind to Steve Norn.

Edjericon is a former chief of the Yellowknives Dene First Nation, during which he signed the  Akaitcho Framework Agreement. Previously, he was also a member of the band council for ten years and was the band housing manager. He has also served six years as the chair of the Mackenzie Valley Impact Review Board. Edjericon has lived in Ndilǫ since 1993.

References

Living people
Members of the Legislative Assembly of the Northwest Territories
21st-century Canadian politicians
Year of birth missing (living people)